WWWW may refer to:

 WWWW-FM, a radio station (102.9 FM) licensed to Ann Arbor, Michigan, United States
 WLLZ (FM), a radio station  (106.7 FM) licensed to Detroit, Michigan, which used the call signs WWWW or WWWW-FM until October 2000
 Web.com, Inc. (NASDAQ symbol WWWW)
 World Wide Web Wanderer, a web crawler used to measure the size of the Web in 1993
 World-Wide Web Worm, an early Internet search engine

See also
 WWW (disambiguation)
 Five Ws